Katzmann is a German surname. Notable people with the surname include:

 Anna Katzmann, Australian barrister and judge
 Frederick G. Katzmann (1875-1953), American attorney and politician
 Fritz Katzmann (1906–1957), high-ranking SS officer, known for authoring the Katzmann Report
 Gary Katzmann (born 1953), American judge
 Mary Jane Katzmann (1828–1890), Canadian poet and editor
 Nosie Katzmann (born 1959), German music producer and writer
 Robert Katzmann (1953–2021), American judge

See also 
 Katzman

German-language surnames
Surnames from nicknames